Tony Hawk's Project 8 is a 2006 skateboarding video game and the eighth installment in the Tony Hawk's series. It was developed by Neversoft and published by Activision in November 2006 for the PlayStation 2, Xbox, Xbox 360, PlayStation 3, and PlayStation Portable. The game complements the release of Tony Hawk's Downhill Jam, which is conversely available on Nintendo systems along with the PlayStation 2 respectively.

Plot
Tony Hawk, impressed with the player's town's undiscovered skate talent, announces the creation of a new skating team entitled 'Project 8', where eight of the town's best skateboarders will be selected for the team. The player character starts ranked 200th and by completing challenges and goals, their ranking will gradually improve.

Gameplay
The 6th-generation versions of the game (PlayStation 2, Xbox) as well as the PlayStation Portable version utilize the engine of the previous installment, Tony Hawk's American Wasteland, and the games that proceeded it. However, the 7th-generation versions (PlayStation 3, Xbox 360) featured a completely new game engine and gameplay to accommodate the more advanced hardware (while too released on the Xbox 360, American Wasteland remained largely the same on that console).

For the 7th-generation versions, Project 8 features an open world, which contains various skate parks and hidden sections. The open world is linear and visibly connected, in contrast to the loading tunnels in American Wasteland. In the 6th-generation version, the levels are separate and have to be manually selected. There are 45 skaters in the game, including unlockable characters, who each have a unique mo-cap style, providing a different experience and no recycled animations.

New features 
The game introduces the 'nail the trick' option. When a player enters this mode the camera will zoom in on the side to focus on the skateboard and the character's feet. Players are then able to use the right analog and left analog sticks to control the right and left feet, allowing the player to flip and rotate the board in any such manner, including tapping the underside of the board in the air and merging various techniques to form new moves.

Another new ability in the game is to control the characters in the game during bails, allowing the player to obtain a high "Hospital bill", with bonus money awarded for broken bones; this feature is used in numerous challenges across the story mode (on PS3 and Xbox 360). Players can also induce a bail manually. The option to walk, which was introduced in Tony Hawk's Underground, is retained. The game also features a system named "Stokens"; landing combos in front of pedestrians will "stoke" them and give you Stokens, which the player can then use to buy items in-game. In the 7th-generation versions, knocking over a pedestrian will cause them to chase the skater and retaliate, but the player is able to evade this if they skate far enough away.

Reception

The game was met with mostly positive reviews upon release, with the Xbox 360 version garnering an overall average of 81% on GameRankings. It was especially the subject of praise for its "Nail the Trick" mode and graphical enhancements. It also received criticism for the removal of several key features.

In the GameSpot review of the PlayStation 3 version, Project 8 was criticized for its unstable framerate. IGN and GameSpot noted and criticized the absence of online functionality across all three PlayStation versions.

Notes

References

2006 video games
Activision games
Multiplayer and single-player video games
Neversoft games
PlayStation 2 games
PlayStation 3 games
PlayStation Portable games
Skateboarding video games
Project 8
Video games set in the United States
Video games featuring protagonists of selectable gender
Xbox games
Xbox 360 games
Video games using Havok
Video games with custom soundtrack support
D.I.C.E. Award for Sports Game of the Year winners
Video games developed in the United States
Page 44 Studios games